Pasar Baru is an administrative village in the Sawah Besar subdistrict (kecamatan) in Central Jakarta of Indonesia. It has postal code of 10710.

Pasar Baru is also the name of a 19th-century market which was established in the neighborhood and gave its name to the administrative village. Established in 1820, Pasar Baru is one of the oldest shopping district in Jakarta.

Pasar Baru is located in the heart of Jakarta's busiest district. The area centered in a street called Jalan Pasar Baru that runs in a north-south axis. The southern edge of the street is marked with a gate and a bridge that span over a canal that connects to Jalan Raya Pos, a section of Java's Great Post Road that runs through Jakarta. Right across the Pasar Baru southern gate is Jakarta Art Building. The Pasar Baru street is lined with numbers of shops, restaurants and also several shopping centers. Most of shops here sell textiles, shoes, clothes and other fashion products, such as; sportswear, watch and jewelries. While shopping center on the north sides specialized on selling cosmetics, cameras and photography products.

Culturally the area demonstrates a fusion of Indonesian, Dutch colonial, Chinese and Indian cultures. Pasar Baru is popularly known as Jakarta's Little India, due to the fact that large numbers of Indian Indonesians settled here (but mostly of Sikh and Sindhi ancestry in contrast to Medan's Kampung Madras, whereby Tamils are the majority regardless of religion), and established their textile business in this market.

Government
As an administrative village (kelurahan), Pasar Baru is the southernmost administrative village of Sawah Besar Subdistrict. It is among the most historic neighborhood of Batavia, the southern half was the former Weltevreden whereas the northern half was the commercial center of Pasar Baru market.

The boundary of kelurahan Pasar Baru is Jalan Lautze to the north, the East Flood canal to the east, Jalan Taman Pejambon I - Abdul Rahman Saleh - Senen Raya IV to the south, and the Ciliwung - railway line to the west.

Pasar Baru market
This section focuses on Pasar Baru as a market, not as the administrative village.

History

Founding of Pasar Baru

Pasar Baru dates back to the early 1820s. It was established as Pasar-Baroe or Passar-Baroe (Malay "new market") to distinguish it with the older markets of Pasar Senen and Pasar Tanah Abang, which were established in 1735.

Pasar Baru was located just to the north of the Euro-centric Weltevreden neighborhood. Despite its close proximity with Weltevreden, the streets of Pasar Baru was dominated with the Chinese community. Another considerable minority centered in Pasar Baru is what the Dutch called andere vreemde oosterlingen ("other foreign Orientals"): Bombay people of the British Indians, mostly from Calcutta and Mumbai. The Bombay people focused their profession on silk trading and other oriental fabrics. They generally speaks more English than Dutch.

Golden period

During the 1950s, Pasar Baru became Jakarta's busiest shopping center for middle- and upper-class consumer. A 1956 guidebook of Jakarta quoted Pasar baru as "the best known shopping-centre of the capital. Almost everything is to be had there: the latest fashions in clothing from Europe, America and Asia, the latest improvements on kitchen-utensils, products on Indonesian art, craft and textiles, the best fruits, home-grown as well as imported ones, tea- and lunch-rooms, jewelers, tailors, shoemakers, furniture dealers etc. etc." Because of the increasing crowd and traffic in Pasar Baru, on August 1, 1957, the government banned parking along the street of Pasar Baru to ease traffic flow. Despite the ban, in practice it was difficult to keep cars from parking in Pasar Baru.

During this golden period, the stores of Pasar Baru were predominantly Chinese, e.g. Warenhuis Sam Hoo. Indian presence was also large, and mostly focused on textile stores known locally as Toko Bombay. Examples of Toko Bombay were Kissoomall, Bagamall, Chotirmall, and Gehimall.

Several Indonesia's largest department store chain trace it roots back to Pasar Baru, e.g. Matahari department store, Indonesia's largest department store chain which started when the founder Hari Darmawan bought a 1920s building at Jalan Pasar Baru 52-58 called Toko de Zon ("sun shop") and rename it Matahari (Indonesian "sun").

Decline

Pasar Baru began to lose out to modern shopping malls of the 1970s and 1980s, such as Gajah Mada Plaza, Aldiron Plaza and Ratu Plaza; as well as large air-conditioned malls in the 1990s. Despite this, Pasar Baru continues to survive with a more mid-market target.

A roof was installed over Pasar Baru street to protect shoppers from the rain.

Attractions
Pasar Baru includes three different areas of Jalan Pintu Air Raya, Metro Atom Plaza and Harco Plaza Pasar Baru, allowing visitors to find almost everything under the sun, such as clothes, footwear, musical instruments, beauty products, watches, cameras and more. In addition to being a shopping paradise, Pasar Baru also offers legendary noodle shops and street food as well as religious spots.
As the area known as Little India, there are Indian apparel outlets and tailors, restaurants, grocery shops. Sai Study Group on Jalan Pasar Baru Selatan, which is the institution hosts lessons about Bhagavan Sri Sathya Sai Baba, one of India's most revered spiritual teachers.
Sin Tek Bio temple, which is located on Jalan Pasar Baru Dalam, was first established in 1698. According to the temple's guidebook, Sin Tek Bio was founded by Chinese farmers who lived around Ciliwung River and Pasar Baru.

Transportation
Pasar Baru is served by TransJakarta Corridor 3. The area can be reached by Juanda station of Jakarta commuter rail.

See also

List of administrative villages of Jakarta

References

Cited works

Administrative villages in Jakarta
Central Jakarta
Little Indias
Shopping malls in Jakarta
Shopping districts and streets in Indonesia
Tourist attractions in Jakarta